Dinko Šimunović (1 September 1873 – 3 August 1933) was a Croatian writer.

Dinko Šimunović was born in Knin. He spent almost two decades as a teacher in villages of the Zagora, the hinterland of Dalmatia. He retired in 1927 and moved to Zagreb in 1929, where he died in 1933.

Šimunović wrote many stories and two novels, all dealing with people from his native region. His contemporaries described his works as championing a patriarchal, hierarchical, black-and-white world, an impression further reinforced by author's personal distaste towards the modern, urban way of living.

Biography
Dinko Šimunović spent his early childhood in Koljane near Vrlika where his father was a teacher in Kijevo. Šimunović completed teacher's school in Arbanasi between 1888 and 1892.

Works
 "Mrkodol" (1909)
 "Đerdan" (1914)
 "Mladost" (The Youth, 1921)
 "Alkar" (The Knight, 1908)
 "Tuđinac" (The Foreigner, 1911)
 "Porodica Vinčić" (Vinčić Family, 1923)
 "Duga" (The Rainbow, 1907)

Alkar was translated to Chinese language and published in Shanghai in 1936.

References

Bibliography

External links
Odabrane pripovijetke

1873 births
1933 deaths
People from Knin
Croatian writers
Burials at Mirogoj Cemetery